Gangnam Beauty is a 2018 South Korean television series starring Im Soo-hyang, Cha Eun-woo, Jo Woo-ri and Kwak Dong-yeon. Based on the webtoon of the same name published in 2016 by Naver, it centers on the life of a college student who went under cosmetic surgery to evade derision from her bullies, yet her decision seems to backfire as her peers ridicule her artificial look. The title of the webtoon and of the TV series alludes to the Korean word gangnammiin (Gangnam beauty), a derogatory term in South Korea for people who are attractive but look as if they went through a number of plastic surgeries for a pretty face, a hot body or both.

The series aired on JTBC from July 27 to September 15, 2018, every Friday and Saturday at 23:00 (KST). It garnered praise for its portrayal of issues affecting South Korean society, particularly on its superficial beauty standards and discrimination on the basis of physical appearance.

Synopsis
Kang Mi-rae (Im Soo-hyang) decides to get plastic surgery after years of being bullied because of her looks. Her "rebirth" seems successful at first, but as her life at the university unfolds, her plan starts to backfire. The pressure of being a "pretty girl" begins to get to her and, worse, those who can see through her surgery ridicule her and tag her as the "Gangnam plastic surgery monster" and as Mi-rae's tries to recover her self-esteem as she gets to know her classmate, and former schoolmate in middle school, Do Kyung-seok (Cha Eun-woo) who is quite cold but very affectionate towards his sister Do Kyung-hee (Kim Ji-min).

Cast

Main
 Im Soo-hyang as Kang Mi-rae
 Jeon Min-seo as young Kang Mi-rae
A timid and insecure girl who has low self-esteem due to her "ugly" appearance. She desires to live a "normal" life and does not like standing out. After being bullied throughout her middle school and high school, she finally decides to undergo cosmetic surgery prior to starting college. As she enters the university, she starts to feel the pressure of being "beautiful" and "popular" among her peers. She aspires to be a perfumer. A student of Chemistry Department of Korea University Class of 2018.
 Cha Eun-woo as Do Kyung-seok 
 Shin Jun-seop as young Do Kyung-seok
 Moon Woo-jin as child Do Kyung-seok
A handsome college student who possesses both intelligence and wealth, but secretly harbors emotional scars from his unhappy home environment. He is indifferent about what others think, thus appearing cold and distant; however, he does have a caring side within him. In particular, he does not care about beauty or physical appearances despite being praised for his good looks. A student of Chemistry Department of Korea University Class of 2018.
 Jo Woo-ri as Hyun Soo-ah
 Lee Chae-yun as young Hyun Soo-ah
The most popular girl in the chemistry department for her extraordinary natural beauty. She appears pure and kind, but the underlying motives of her actions eventually prove otherwise. She craves attention and adoration, attempting to attain it (or, at times, steal it) with her gentle and innocent persona as she cannot accept the potential for anyone to love other girls more than they admire her. A student of Chemistry Department of Korea University Class of 2018.
 Kwak Dong-yeon as Yeon Woo-young
A chemistry graduate and teaching assistant in the chemistry department. He is also Do Kyung-seok's housemate later on. He is popular among the students for his handsome appearance and also his friendly and polite persona. He falls for Kang Mi-rae for her looks but grows to love her personality as they both shares their expertise in perfumes.

Supporting

People around Kang Mi-rae
 Woo Hyun as Kang Tae-sik
Kang Mi-rae's father as well as taxi-driver. He is initially against Mi-rae's surgery, but later learns to accept all forms of her.
 Kim Sun-hwa as Na Eun-sim
Kang Mi-rae's mother. An insurance planner. She assists Mi-rae in receiving cosmetic surgery without the knowledge of her father.
 Min Do-hee as Oh Hyun-jung
A Childhood friend of Kang Mi-rae. A first-year psychology student in Korea University who dreams of being a hip-hop musician. She has a crush on Yeon Woo-young.

People around Do Kyung-seok
 Park Joo-mi as Na Hye-sung
Do Kyung-seok's mother and CEO of a cosmetics company. Due to a divorce that resulted from an abusive marriage, she has been separated from her children for years, until she met her son again through Kang Mi-rae.
 Park Sung-geun as Do Sang-won 
Do Kyung-seok's father as well as a congressman running for mayor. A self-centered and career-oriented man.
 Kim Ji-min as Do Kyung-hee 
Do Kyung-seok's 17-year old sister. An internet broadcasting jockey.
 Lee Tae-sun as Woo-jin 
Do Kyung-seok's childhood friend. A bar owner.

Chemistry students
 Park Yoo-na as Yoo Eun 
The freshmen (Class of 2018) representative. Her chic personality makes her popular among the students. She has an innate sense of fairness and takes no sides in any conflict. She encounters Soo-ah in her neighborhood and starts questioning her actual family background.
 Jung Seung-hye as Choi Jung-boon 
A freshman. A cheerful girl from Busan with a strong accent. She has a crush on Woo-jin.
 Jung Hye-rin as Lee Ji-hyo 
A freshman who is close friends with Soo-ah. Considered the prettiest in her class after Soo-ah and Mi-rae. She is self-conscious about her physical appearance and what people think of her. 
 Kim Doh-yon as Jang Won-ho 
A freshman. He has a crush on Soo-ah, and treats Kyung-seok as his biggest rival.
 Kim Eun-soo as Kim Sung-woon 
A freshman. Jung Won-ho's best friend.
 Oh Hee-joon as Kim Chan-woo 
A student from Class of 2013 is in his third year of repeat studies. He is known as "Master Dog" due to his crude personality. He bullies Mi-rae after she rejected his confession, and develops a crush on Soo-ah. He later gets beat up by Kyung-seok for bullying Mi-rae while Woo-young threatens to ruin his future if he ever does it again.
 Ryu Ki-san as Goo Tae-young
A second-year student. President of the student council. He has an indecisive personality and wavers in his decision to date Tae-hee.
Baek Soo-min as Go Ye-na 
A sophomore. A student council member in charge of student affairs. She used to be the most popular girl of the Chemistry department till Soo-ah came along. She has a crush on Kyung-seok, but later develops feelings for Jung-ho.
 Bae Da-bin as Kwon Yoon-byul
The representative of the sophomores (Class of 2017). Vice president of the student council. She is decisive and responsible, with an honest and blunt personality. Because of her boyish looks, she is popular among women. She later develops a crush on Woo-young, but is rejected.
 Lee Ye-rim as Kim Tae-hee
A sophomore. Secretary of the student council. She feels insecure due to her plump body. She likes Tae-young. 
 Choi Sung-won as Song Jung-ho
A sophomore. A mood maker. He has a crush on Ye-na since the first year. Join the army after his sophomore year.
Seo Ji-hye as Noh Min-a
A sophomore. She likes to gossip.
 Kim Il-rin as Yeo-woo
The representative of the third year students (Class of 2016). A superficial person who only cares about physical appearances. 
 Ham Sung-min as Jung Dong-won
A freshman. He is a motae solo and otaku with a huge presence on the Internet community. He is deluded that Soo-ah likes him. 
 Kim Min-ha as Sun-mi
A second-year student. She has a great relationship with the juniors.

Others
 Jung Myung-hoon as Young-mo 
Chief of the National Assembly. Do Sang-won's assistant.
 Ji Sang-hyuk as Lee Soo-hyun 
Business director of the cosmetics company operated by Nae-seong.
 Ha Kyung as Yong Chul
Mi-rae's middle school crush who brutally rejected her, mostly due to her physical appearance.
 Yoo In-soo as Park Rae-sun
 Cha Bo-sung as Ye Joon, a freshman (Ep. 2-3)

Special appearances
 Lee Young-ae
 Um Hong-gil
 Ahn Sang-tae as Taxi passenger 
 Junoflo
 Jeon Jin-ki as Priest
 Yoon Bo-ra
 Tiger JK
 Bizzy
 Han Hyun-min
 Abhishek Gupta

Production
 The series is written by Choi Soo-young (Cunning Single Lady, 2014).
 The first script reading took place on May 30, 2018 at JTBC building in Sangam-dong, Seoul, South Korea.

Reception
The series garnered much praise for its cryptic portrayal of the main character's childhood. Viewers applauded director Choi for his thoughtful representation of the characters.

The series was a commercial success and garnered critical praise for asking questions about the emphasis that society places on appearances and about the true meaning of happiness and beauty.

The cast and staff of the drama went on a reward vacation to Cebu, Philippines for 4 nights and 5 days on October 19, 2018.

Original soundtrack

Part 1

Part 2

Part 3

Part 4

Part 5

Part 6

Part 7

Part 8

Part 9

Viewership

Awards and nominations

Notes

References

External links

  
 
 

2018 South Korean television series debuts
2018 South Korean television series endings
Korean-language television shows
South Korean romantic comedy television series
South Korean television series remade in other languages
JTBC television dramas
Television shows based on South Korean webtoons
2010s college television series
South Korean college television series